Peter Openshaw may refer to:

 Peter Openshaw (judge) (born 1947), English judge
 Peter Openshaw (immunologist) (born 1954), English immunologist

See also
 Openshaw (disambiguation)